Lembit Oll (23 April 1966 – 16 May 1999) was an Estonian chess grandmaster.

Chess career
Born in Kohtla-Järve on 23 April 1966, Oll became Estonian Chess Champion in 1982 and U20 Soviet Chess Champion in 1984. FIDE awarded him the international master title in 1983 and the grandmaster title in 1990. From then on, he regularly played for Estonia at the Chess Olympiads and European Team Chess Championships. In July 1998, he reached his highest rating and position on the FIDE world rankings: 2650 and No. 25, respectively. He played his last tournament in 1999 in Nova Gorica, sharing second place.

List of victories
1989: Espoo, Tallinn (zonal tournament), Helsinki.
1990: Terrassa.
1991: Sydney, Helsinki.
1992: Seville.
1993: Vilnius, The Hague, Antwerp.
1994: New York City Open (shared 1st with Jaan Ehlvest).
1995: Helsinki, Riga (zonal tournament).
1996: Saint Petersburg.
1997: Køge, Szeged (shared 1st), Hoogeveen (shared 1st).

Olympiads
Oll played for Estonia four times in Chess Olympiads.
 In 1992, at second board at the 30th Olympiad in Manila (+7 –1 =6);
 In 1994, at first board at the 31st Olympiad in Moscow (+3 –2 =8);
 In 1996, at second board at the 32nd Olympiad in Yerevan (+2 –1 =9);
 In 1998, at first board at the 33rd Olympiad in Elista (+1 –0 =7).

Personal life
Oll, who was married and had two sons, fell into depression after his divorce and loss of child custody. He had received mental health treatment since 1996 and was prescribed anti-depressants. He committed suicide on 16 May 1999 by jumping out of a window of his fourth-floor apartment in Tallinn. Despite his personal problems, he was No. 42 on the FIDE world rankings at the time of his death. He was buried at Metsakalmistu cemetery in Tallinn, not far away from the most famous Estonian chess player Paul Keres.

References

Further reading
New In Chess, 1999, #4

External links

1966 births
1999 suicides
Burials at Metsakalmistu
Chess grandmasters
Chess Olympiad competitors
Estonian chess players
Sportspeople from Kohtla-Järve
Suicides by jumping in Estonia
20th-century chess players